Theodore D. George (born 1971) is an American philosopher and professor and chair of the department of philosophy at Texas A&M University. 
He is known for his expertise on post-Kantian philosophy and hermeneutics, in particular, his work on Hans-Georg Gadamer. 
George is the editor of Epoché: A Journal for the History of Philosophy. 
He was the president of North American Society for Philosophical Hermeneutics between 2013 and 2016.

Books
 The Responsibility to Understand: Hermeneutical Contrours of Ethical Life (Edinburgh: Edinburgh University Press, 2020)
 Charles Bambach and Theodore George, eds., Philosophers and their Poets: Reflections on the Poetic Turn in Philosophy Since Kant (Albany: State University of New York Press, 2019)
 Tragedies of Spirit: Tracing Finitude in Hegel’s Phenomenology (State University of New York Press, 2006; paperback, 2007), 
 Günter Figal, Objectivity: The Hermeneutical and Philosophy (Albany: State University of New York Press, 2010), English translation of Günter Figal, Gegenständlichkeit: Das Hermeneutische und die Philosophie (Tübingen: Mohr Siebeck, 2006). Paperback edition: July 2011.

Articles 

 George, Theodore. “Art as Testimony of Tradition and as Testimony of Ordering.” Internationales Jahrbuch für Hermeneutik 16 (2007): 107–120. 
 George, Theodore. “What is the Future of the Past? Gadamer and Hegel on Truth, Art, and the Ruptures of Tradition.” Journal of the British Society for Phenomenology 40 (2009): 4–20. 
 George, Theodore. “From Work to Play: Gadamer on the Affinity of Art, Truth, and Beauty.” Internationales Jahrbuch für Hermeneutik, 10 (2011): 107–122.
George, Theodore. "Thing, Object, Life." Research in Phenomenology 42 (2012): 18–43.
George, Theodore. "Are We a Conversation? Hermeneutics, Exteriority, and Transmittability." Research in Phenomenology 47 (2017): 331–350.

References

External links
 Theodore George at Texas A&M
 Works by Theodore George
 
Theodore George at Google Scholar
Theodore George at Academia.edu

21st-century American philosophers
Phenomenologists
Continental philosophers
Philosophers of art
Hermeneutists
Gadamer scholars
Hegel scholars
Philosophy academics
Heidegger scholars
Villanova University alumni
Texas A&M University faculty
Whitman College alumni
German–English translators
1971 births
Living people
Philosophy journal editors